Norman Stanley Le Brun (22 April 1908 – 15 November 1944) was an Australian rules footballer who played with South Melbourne, Essendon, Collingwood and Carlton in the Victorian Football League (VFL). He was one of the few players to play with four different VFL clubs.

Family
The son of Francis Thomas Willimet Le Brun (1876–1952), and Mary Jane Le Brun (1875–1955), née West, Norman Stanley Le Brun was born in Richmond, Victoria on 22 April 1908.

Football

South Melbourne (VFL)
Granted a clearance from Richmond, he played 3 senior games for South Melbourne in 1929.

Sandhurst (BFL)
Cleared from South Melbourne in April 1930 to Sandhurst Football Club in the Bendigo Football League, Le Brun won the inaugural Bendigo Football League best and fairest award, the Fred Wood Medal in 1930.

Essendon (VFL)
Cleared from Sandhurst to Essendon Football Club in May 1931,

Collingwood (VFL)
Cleared from Essendon to Collingwood Football Club in April 1933, he played 19 senior games over two seasons (1933–1934).

Carlton (VFL)
Cleared from Collingwood to Carlton in April 1935, he played in five senior matches.

Griffith Football Club (LDFA)
In 1936 he was appointed captain-coach of the Griffith Football Club in the Leeton District Football Association.

South Warrnambool (HFL)
In 1937 he was appointed captain-coach of the South Warrnambool Football Club in the Hampden Football League.

Wangaratta (OMFA)
In 1938 he was appointed as playing-coach of the Wangaratta Football Club in the Ovens & Murray Football Association. Having coached the side to the Association's premiership in 1938, he was re-appointed in 1939.

Ganmain (SWDFL)
In 1940 he was appointed as playing-coach of the Ganmain Football Club in the South West District Football League and coached them to a premiership.

Military service
Employed as a bricklayer at the time, he enlisted as a commando in the Second AIF on 26 February 1942, a week after the Bombing of Darwin.

He was killed in action, when shot by a Japanese sniper, on 15 November 1944, in New Guinea during the Aitape–Wewak campaign.
… In the Aitape sector, too, is the Le Brun Feature, a steep hill on the Danmap River, and known now simply as Le Brun.It is named after the first Australian killed in the area, Norman Le Brun, trooper in a cavalry commando squadron, and former well-known Victorian footballer. The Herald, 5 May 1945.

He is buried at the Lae War Cemetery.

See also
 List of Victorian Football League players who died in active service

Footnotes

References

 Holmesby, Russell & Main, Jim (2007). The Encyclopedia of AFL Footballers. 7th ed. Melbourne: Bas Publishing.
 Main, J. & Allen, D., "Le Brun, Norm", pp.288–290 in Main, J. & Allen, D., Fallen – The Ultimate Heroes: Footballers Who Never Returned From War, Crown Content, (Melbourne), 2002.
 Second World War Nominal Roll: Trooper Norman Stanley LeBrun (VX76818), Department of Veterans' Affairs.
 Second World War Service Record: Trooper Norman Stanley LeBrun (VX76818), National Archives of Australia.

External links
 
 
 Norm Le Brun, at Boyles Football Photos.
 Norm Le Brun, at Blueseum.
 Norm Le Brun, at Collingwood Forever.
 Roll of Honour: Trooper Norman Stanley LeBrun (VX76818), Australian War Memorial.
 The Weekly Times, (Saturday, 11 October 1930), p.36. Photograph: 1930 Sandhurst Football Team 
 The Weekly Times, (Saturday, 26 May 1934), p.37. Photograph: 1934 Collingwood Football Team
1938 Ovens & Murray FL Premiers: Wangaratta FC team photo
 The sad demise of Trooper Le Brun at On Reflection

1908 births
1944 deaths
Australian rules footballers from Melbourne
Sydney Swans players
Collingwood Football Club players
Essendon Football Club players
Carlton Football Club players
Wangaratta Football Club players
Sandhurst Football Club players
Australian military personnel killed in World War II
Australian Army personnel of World War II
Australian Army soldiers
Deaths by firearm in Papua New Guinea
Australian bricklayers
Burials at Lae War Cemetery
People from Richmond, Victoria
Australian rules football coaches
Military personnel from Melbourne